A sari is a female garment in the Indian subcontinent.

Sari may also refer to:

Places 
 Sari, Iran, provincial capital of Mazandaran
 Sari County, a county in Mazandaran
 Sari, Ardabil, a village in Ardabil Province, Iran
 Sari Kuchakeh, a village in Lorestan Province, Iran
 Sari Miri, a village in Lorestan Province, Iran
 Kalateh-ye Sari, a village in South Khorasan Province, Iran
 Sari, Zanjan, a village in Zanjan Province, Iran
 Sari, Nepal, a V.D.C. and town in Pyuthan district, Nepal
 Nav Sari, city in Gujarat, India

People

Surname
 Georges Sari (1925 – 2012), Greek author and actress
 Laila Sari (1935 – 2017), Indonesian comedian and singer
 Morad Sari (born 1973), French-Algerian kickboxer
 Riri Fitri Sari (born 1970), Indonesian computer engineer and academic
 Sirkka Sari (1920 – 1939), Finnish actress
 Sarı, a Turkish surname

Given name
 Sari Essayah (born 1967), Finnish race walker and politician
 Sari Furuya (born 1990), Japanese biathlete
 Sari Grönholm (1980), Finnish snowboarder
 Sari Kaasinen, Finnish musician, co-founder of the folk-music band Värttinä
 Sari Laine (born 1962), Finnish karateka
 Sari Lennick (born 1975), American actress
 Sari Simorangkir (born 1975), Indonesian contemporary Christian singer and songwriter
 Sari van Veenendaal (born 1990), a Dutch footballer
 Zsa Zsa Gabor (1917 – 2016), born Sári Gábor, Hungarian-American actress
 Sari, a Hebrew variety of the female given name Sarah

Acronyms and abbreviations 
 Serotonin antagonist and reuptake inhibitor (SARI), a class of pharmaceuticals used as antidepressants
 Severe Acute Respiratory Infection (SARI) or influenza-like illness, a medical diagnosis
 Simplified Airway Risk Index (SARI), a risk score for predicting difficult tracheal intubation
 Cataratas del Iguazú International Airport (ICAO code: SARI)

Other
 Sari (operetta) or Der Zigeunerprimas, an operetta by Emmerich Kálmán
 Sari temple, an 8th-century Buddhist temple in Yogyakarta, Indonesia
 Sari Sumdac, a fictional character in the TV series Transformers: Animated

See also
 5ARI or 5α-Reductase inhibitor, a type of antiandrogen drug
 
 Saari (disambiguation)

Indonesian-language surnames
Surnames of Indonesian origin
Japanese feminine given names